Lies on the Prize is the fifth album by Canadian indie rock artist Snailhouse. It was released in July 2008 on the Unfamiliar Records label.

Award nominations
On June 15, 2009, Lies on the Prize was longlisted for the 2009 Polaris Music Prize.

Track listing
Dollar Signs
(Not) Superstitious
Salvation Army
Tone Deaf Birds
They Won't Believe You
Who We Are
Mahogany
O My God
Fire Alarm
Blue Sun
Born in the City
Tell Me What You Want
Homesick

References

Snailhouse albums
2008 albums